Cyprus has participated in the Eurovision Young Dancers 9 times since its debut in 1989. Cyprus is one of the poorest performing countries in the contest, with no finals appearances.

Both Hélène O'Keefe and Carolina Constantinou have participated twice for Cyprus.

Participation overview

See also
Cyprus in the Eurovision Song Contest
Cyprus in the Eurovision Young Musicians
Cyprus in the Junior Eurovision Song Contest

External links 
 Eurovision Young Dancers

Countries in the Eurovision Young Dancers